The Costume Designers Guild Award for Excellence in Fantasy Costume Design for Film was one of the annual awards given by Costume Designers Guild.

This award was first combined with Costume Designers Guild Award for Excellence in Period Costume Design for Film in 1999, and it was separated into its own category starting in 2005.

Winners and Nominees

1999-2004 (Fantasy or Period)

2005-2009 (Fantasy)

2010s

Costume Designers Guild Awards
Awards for film costume design